Thriving Ivory is the self-titled debut album of American rock band Thriving Ivory. The album was originally released on May 18, 2003 on the Wolfgang label. The album was re-released on June 21, 2008 on Wind-up Records, replacing the song "Flowers For A Ghost" with "Alien". The sound of their self-titled release was inspired by bands such as U2 and Coldplay. The album peaked at number 1 on the Billboard Heatseekers chart.

Song information 
Keyboard player Scott Jason told Songfacts the track "Alien", "is the most personal song [to me] on the record. That song is about my brother. And my brother, he's a brilliant, brilliant, brilliant kid, a full scholarship to Berkeley, and he's gone through some pretty heavy stuff. So that song is really personal."

Track listing

Wind-up Records, 2008

Wolfgang Records, 2003

References

External links 
Album details at Amazon

2003 albums
2008 albums
Thriving Ivory albums
Wind-up Records albums